Shivaji III was a pretender to the throne of the Thanjavur Maratha kingdom. He was the only son of Serfoji III, adopted son of Shivaji II, the last Maratha ruler of Thanjavur. He held the title "Senior Prince of Tanjore".

References 

People of the Thanjavur Maratha kingdom